Tsung Tsin Mission of Hong Kong Kau Yan Church is a church in Sai Ying Pun, Hong Kong. The building is located at Western Street, between Third and High Streets. The church was established by the Basel Mission and is now succeeded by the Tsung Tsin Mission of Hong Kong.

The existing Gothic Revival church building was completed in 1932, but the church's history dates back to 1861, when Rev Theodore Hamberg established a Hakka congregation at the site.

See also
 Tsung Tsin Mission of Hong Kong

External links
 
 Historic Building Appraisal: Tsung Tsin Mission of Hong Kong Kau Yan Church

Grade I historic buildings in Hong Kong
Protestant churches in Hong Kong
Sai Ying Pun